Cleveland Everette Gary (born May 4, 1966), also known as Cleveland Edward Gary, is a former professional American football running back in the National Football League (NFL). He was selected in the first round of the 1989 NFL draft by the Los Angeles Rams. Cleveland led the NFL in touchdowns in 1990 with 14. In 1992 Cleveland rushed for 1,125 yards and caught 52 passes.

Gary began his college career at the University of Georgia where in his first start as a true freshman against Clemson he rushed for 101 yards and scored two touchdowns. After his freshman year at Georgia, Cleveland made the cover of Inside Sports Magazine and was touted as the best running back in the SEC as a true freshman. After his freshman season at the University of Georgia he transferred to the University of Miami, where he became a first-team All-American and set a school record for most catches (57) ever in a single season by a running back that stills stands. After leaving the Hurricanes and before being drafted in the first round by the Los Angeles Rams, he was voted MVP of the Senior Bowl.

At the University of Miami, after playing only one season of baseball for the Miami Hurricanes, Gary was offered a six-figure baseball contract from the Atlanta Braves in 1989. In 1990 Gary played professional baseball in the minor leagues for the Montreal Expos as an outfielder and displayed tremendous power as a hitter.

Gary attended South Fork High School, where he was an outstanding baseball and football player. In baseball, he played shortstop for the South Fork Bulldogs and was a tremendous power hitter. Against archrival Martin County High School his 450 ft home run over center field wall is noted as the longest hit home run in Bulldog history. In football, he was a Parade Magazine High School Football All-American. In his senior season, he rushed for 2,100 yards and scored 30 touchdowns. He was one of the nations most sought out athletes coming out of high school.

Gary became part owner of the National Indoor Football League, an indoor football organization that ran for several seasons in the 2000s. Some of the teams included: Palm Beach Waves, Port St. Lucie Mustangs, Green Cove Lions, Beaumont Drillers, Fort Worth Sixers, San Antonio Steers, Wyoming Cavalry, Fort Myers Tarpons, Fayetteville Guard, LA Lynx, and San Diego Shock Waves, however, the NIFL ended operations in the 2007 season.

NFL career statistics

References

Living people
1966 births
American football running backs
Miami Hurricanes football players
Miami Hurricanes baseball players
Los Angeles Rams players
Miami Dolphins players
People from Stuart, Florida
Players of American football from Florida